The 2019 Brickyard 400, branded as Big Machine Vodka 400 at the Brickyard presented by Golden Corral, was a Monster Energy NASCAR Cup Series race held on September 8, 2019 at Indianapolis Motor Speedway in Speedway, Indiana. It is the 26th running of the Brickyard 400. Contested over 160 laps on the  speedway, it was the 26th race of the 2019 Monster Energy NASCAR Cup Series season, and the final race of the regular season before the playoffs.

This race marks the final Brickyard 400 start for 4-time winner Brickyard 400 Jimmie Johnson.

Report

Background

The Indianapolis Motor Speedway, located in Speedway, Indiana, (an enclave suburb of Indianapolis) in the United States, is the home of the Indianapolis 500 and the Brickyard 400.

Constructed in 1909, it is the original speedway, the first racing facility so named. It has a permanent seating capacity estimated at 235,000 with infield seating raising capacity to an approximate 400,000. It is the highest-capacity sports venue in the world.

Entry list
 (i) denotes driver who are ineligible for series driver points.
 (R) denotes rookie driver.

Practice

First practice

Final practice

Qualifying

Qualifying results

Race

Stage results

Stage One
Laps: 50

Stage Two
Laps: 50

Final stage results

Stage Three
Laps: 60

Race statistics
 Lead changes: 13 among 8 different drivers
 Cautions/Laps: 9 for 48
 Red flags: 1 for 12 minutes and 36 seconds
 Time of race: 3 hours, 20 minutes and 6 seconds
 Average speed:

Media

Television
NBC Sports covered the race on the television side. The broadcast was produced similarly to NBC's Watkins Glen International race broadcasts. Rick Allen and Steve Letarte had the call in the booth for the race. Motor Racing Network broadcaster Mike Bagley called from Turn 2, Dale Earnhardt Jr. called from Turn 3, and Jeff Burton called from Turn 4. Dave Burns, Marty Snider and Kelli Stavast reported from pit lane during the race.

Radio
Indianapolis Motor Speedway Radio Network and the Performance Racing Network jointly co-produced the radio broadcast for the race, which was simulcast on Sirius XM NASCAR Radio, and aired on IMS or PRN stations, depending on contractual obligations. The lead announcers and two pit reporters were PRN staff, while the turns and two pit reporters were from IMS.

Standings after the race

Drivers' Championship standings after Playoffs reset

Manufacturers' Championship standings

Note: Only the first 16 positions are included for the driver standings.

References

2019 Brickyard 400
Brickyard 400
Brickyard 400
Brickyard 400